Daniel of Kholm (Russian Даниил Дмитриевич Холмский; died in 1493) was a Russian knyaz, boyar and voyevoda, one of the most prominent military leaders of Ivan the Great. He belonged to the princely house of Kholmsky and was the father of another voyevoda, Vasily Kholmsky.

Biography
Daniel of Kholm was the son of the knyaz Dmitry Yurievich Kholmsky and was a descendant of Princes of Tver. In the 1460s, he entered the Muscovite service. He became famous after his brilliant victory over Kazan tatars near Murom in 1468, where he was successful with an unexpected strike from the besieged city. However, since the Tatar assaults on Russian borders continued, the Muscovite army started a campaign against Kazan. Daniel was the commander of the avantgarde troops and defeated khan Ibrahim, forcing him to sign a peace treaty with Ivan III. The treaty obliged the khanate to return all the Russian captives and to establish a friendly relationship with Moscow.

In 1471, Daniel Kholmsky led Ivan's military campaign against Novgorod. After achieving two minor victories near Korostyn and Staraya Russa, he soundly defeated the Novgorodians in the battle of Shelon which had a decisive impact on the power balance between the two sides and paved the way for the future annexation of Novgorod.

In the summer 1472, Kholmsky led an army against the Tatar forces of Akhmat Khan of the Great Horde who captured and destroyed the town of Alexin. The Khan didn't risk to fight with Kholmsky and returned to the steppes. The next year, Kholmsky helped the allied city of Pskov which was being besieged by Livonian knights. Due to courageous and clever action, Kholmsky could enforce a peace treaty which obliged to Livonians to leave the lands of Pskov and to grant Russian merchants free trade rights in the Baltic. This treaty was later called Daniel's peace by the chronists. For this, Ivan III gave Daniel the boyar title.

Soon, Kholmsky was confronted with false accusations of intended treason by begrudging boyars. It was the support of the clergy and the surety of 2000 rubles by eight Muscovite nobles that helped Kholmsky to regain the confidence of the Grand Prince.

During the second campaign of Ivan III against Novgorod in the autumn of 1477, Daniel led the main Muscovite army over the ice of the Ilmen lake. In the course of one night, he managed to encircle Novgorod and forced the city to surrender to Ivan III.

In October and November 1480 Daniel Kholmsky took part in the famous Great Standing on the Ugra River where he was the one of the commanders of the Russian forces and organized the fortifications. With his efforts, Kholmsky substantially contributed to the final overthrowing of the Tatar rule over Russia.

In 1487, Kholmsky once again led a Muscovite army against Kazan and captured the besieged city on July 9. The result of this event was the deposition of Ivan III's adversary and his replacement by the Moscow-friendly Möxämmädämin.

In 1492 knyaz Kholmsky took part in the war against Lithuania and helped Upper Oka Principalities to protect their independence from Alexander Jagiellon. Kholmsky died in 1493.

External links
 Knyaz Kholmsky, Н.С. Борисов "Русские полководцы XIII-XVI веков"

1493 deaths
Russian nobility
Russian military leaders
Place of birth missing
Year of birth unknown